is a railway station in the city of Shimada, Shizuoka Prefecture, Japan, operated by Central Japan Railway Company (JR Tōkai). The station is also a freight depot for the Japan Freight Railway Company (JR Freight).

Lines
Shimada Station is served by the Tōkaidō Main Line, and is located 207.8 kilometers from the starting point of the line at Tokyo Station.

Station layout
The station has an island platform serving Track 1 and Track 2, and a side platform serving the seldom-used Track 3. The platforms are connected to the station building by an overpass. The station building has automated ticket machines, TOICA automated turnstiles and a staffed ticket office.

Platforms

Adjacent stations

|-
!colspan=5|Central Japan Railway Company

Station history
Shimada Station was opened on April 16, 1889 when the section of the Tōkaidō Main Line connecting Shizuoka with Hamamatsu was completed. Regularly scheduled freight service was discontinued in 1984, but continued on a charter service until 1993.

Station numbering was introduced to the section of the Tōkaidō Line operated JR Central in March 2018; Shimada Station was assigned station number CA24.

Passenger statistics
In fiscal 2017, the station was used by an average of 5534 passengers daily (boarding passengers only).

Surrounding area
Shimada City Hall
Oi Jinja

See also
 List of Railway Stations in Japan

References

Yoshikawa, Fumio. Tokaido-sen 130-nen no ayumi. Grand-Prix Publishing (2002) .

External links

  

Railway stations in Japan opened in 1889
Railway stations in Shizuoka Prefecture
Tōkaidō Main Line
Stations of Central Japan Railway Company
Stations of Japan Freight Railway Company
Shimada, Shizuoka